Anwar Khalil Mohamed (born 1965) is a Bahraini taekwondo practitioner. He competed in the men's featherweight at the 1988 Summer Olympics.

References

External links
 
 

1965 births
Living people
Date of birth missing (living people)
Place of birth missing (living people)
Bahraini male taekwondo practitioners
Olympic taekwondo practitioners of Bahrain
Taekwondo practitioners at the 1988 Summer Olympics